The government of Pere Aragonès was formed on 26 May 2021 following the latter's election as President of the Government of Catalonia by the Parliament of Catalonia on 21 May and his swearing-in on 24 May, as a result of Republican Left of Catalonia (ERC) and Together for Catalonia (JxCat) being able to muster a majority of seats in the Parliament with external support from the Popular Unity Candidacy (CUP) following the 2021 Catalan regional election.

Until 2022, the cabinet comprised members of ERC and JxCat, as well as a number of independents proposed by both parties. On 7 October, JxCat members voted to abandon the government following the dismissal of their vice president Jordi Puigneró by Aragonès, which resulted from a political crisis sparked after JxCat had demanded a confidence vote on the president. Aragonès vowed to remain as the head of a minority cabinet made up of ERC members.

Investiture

Cabinet changes
Aragonès's government saw a number of cabinet changes during its tenure:
On 28 September 2022, Pere Aragonès announced the dismissal of Vice President and Digital Policies and Territory minister Jordi Puigneró, following a political crisis between the two coalition partners ERC and JxCat over the latter's demand of a confidence vote on the president. As a result of the dismissal, JxCat announced that it would held a party vote on its permanence in the cabinet among its members on 7 October, which resulted in 56% in favour of leaving. As a result, Jaume Giró was replaced by Natàlia Mas as Minister of Economy and Finance; Meritxell Serret replaced Victòria Alsina at the helm of the Foreign Action ministry; Joaquim Nadal replaced Gemma Geis in Research and Universities; Josep Maria Argimon was replaced by Manuel Balcells as Minister of Health, whereas Carles Campuzano and Gemma Ubasart became the new officeholders of the Social Rights and Justice portfolios, respectively. Finally, Juli Fernández was appointed to fill the vacancy left in the Territory ministry by Puigneró's dismissal.

Executive Council
The Executive Council is structured into the offices for the president, the vice president and 14 ministries.

Departmental structure
Pere Aragonès's government is organised into several superior and governing units, whose number, powers and hierarchical structure may vary depending on the ministerial department.

Unit/body rank
() General secretary
() Director-general

Notes

References

 
Cabinets of Catalonia
Cabinets established in 2021